Outside Sweden, pirate parties have been started in over 40 countries, inspired by the Swedish initiative.

National pirate parties

Super-national pirate parties

Sub-national and regional pirate parties

Youth wings

References

 
Pirate Parties, List of
Internet privacy organizations
Politics and technology
Internet-related activism
Computer law organizations
Intellectual property activism
Privacy organizations
Civil liberties advocacy groups
Intellectual property organizations
Digital rights organizations